The Regele Ferdinand class was a pair of destroyers built in Italy for the Romanian Navy during the late 1920s. The sister ships were the most modern and powerful warships of the Axis powers in the Black Sea during World War II. During the war they participated in the 1941 Raid on Constanța and the 1944 evacuation of the Crimea, although they spent the vast majority of the war escorting convoys in the Black Sea. The Romanians claimed that they sank two submarines during the war, but Soviet records do not confirm their claims. Following King Michael's Coup, where Romania switched sides and joined the Allies in late 1944, the two ships were seized and incorporated into the Soviet Black Sea Fleet. They were returned to Romania in 1951 and served until 1961 when they were scrapped.

Background and design
Following the end of World War I and the re-purchase of two Aquila-class cruisers from Italy, the Romanian Government decided to order several modern destroyers from the Pattison Yard in Naples, Italy, as part of the 1927 Naval Programme. The design was based on the British Shakespeare-class destroyer leaders, but differed in the arrangement of their propulsion machinery. The guns, however, were imported from Sweden and the fire-control system were from Germany. Four destroyers were intended to be ordered, but only two were actually built.

Their crew numbered 212 officers and sailors. The ships were powered by two Parsons geared steam turbines, each driving a single propeller, using steam provided by four Thornycroft boilers.

The main armament of the Regele Ferdinand-class ships consisted of five 50-calibre Bofors  guns in single mounts, two superfiring pairs fore and aft of the superstructure and one gun aft of the rear funnel. For anti-aircraft defence, they were equipped with one Bofors  anti-aircraft (AA) gun between the funnels and a pair of  AA guns. The ships were fitted with two triple mounts for  torpedo tubes and could carry 50 mines and 40 depth charges.  They were equipped with a Siemens fire-control system which included a pair of rangefinders, one each for the fore and aft guns.

Modifications
The 40-millimetre guns were replaced by two German  AA guns and a pair of French  M1929 Hotchkiss machineguns were added in 1939. Two Italian depth charge throwers were later installed. During World War II, the 76-millimetre gun was replaced by four  AA guns. In 1943, the two ships were equipped with a German S-Gerät sonar. The following year, the upper forward 120-millimetre gun was replaced by a German  AA gun. German 88-millimetre guns in Romanian service were themselves modified by being fitted with Romanian-produced barrel liners.

Ships

Service history
The sisters were commissioned into the Romanian Navy when they arrived at Constanța, on 7 September 1930. They were assigned to the Destroyer Squadron, which was visited by King Carol II of Romania and the Prime Minister, Nicolae Iorga, on 27 May 1931. Regina Maria participated in the Coronation Fleet review for King George VI in 1937 at Spithead.

On 26 June 1941, shortly after the Axis invasion of the Soviet Union (Operation Barbarossa), Regina Maria helped repel a Soviet naval attack against the main Romanian port of Constanța, together with the flotilla leader Mărăști. The Romanians were expecting an attack and the accuracy of their fire, reinforced by the heavy guns of the German coastal artillery battery Tirpitz, caused the Soviet ships to withdraw, losing the destroyer leader  in a Romanian minefield that had been laid shortly before the start of the war. Her sister ship  was lightly damaged by one of the Romanian ships and the heavy cruiser Voroshilov was slightly damaged by a Romanian mine as the Soviets were withdrawing.

Massively outnumbered by the Soviet Black Sea Fleet, the Romanian ships were kept behind the minefields defending Constanța for the next several months, training for the convoy escort mission that would be their primary task for the rest of the war. Beginning on 5 October, the Romanians began laying minefields to defend the route between the Bosphorus and Constanța; the minelayers were protected by the destroyers. After the evacuation of Odessa on 16 October, the Romanians began to clear the Soviet mines defending the port and to lay their own minefields protecting the route between Constanța and Odessa.

During the winter of 1941–1942, the Romanian destroyers were primarily occupied with escorting convoys between the Bosporus and Constanța, and then, after the ice melted in April 1942, to Ochakov and Odessa. After the garrison of Sevastopol surrendered on 4 July, a direct route between the port and Constanța was opened in October and operated year-round. Regina Maria and Regele Ferdinand also escorted the minelayers as they laid defensive minefields to protect the convoy routes in 1942–1943. The latter ship claimed to have sunk a submarine, possibly , on 16 September 1943. Soviet sources, however, do not acknowledge any submarine lost on that day.

Successful Soviet attacks in early 1944 cut the overland connection of the Crimea with the rest of Ukraine and encircled Axis troops in Sevastopol during April. The Romanians began evacuating the city on 14 April, with their destroyers covering the troop convoys. After the  cargo ship  was bombed and set on fire by Soviet aircraft on 18 April, the sisters were dispatched to see if she could be salvaged. They put a skeleton crew aboard to operate her pumps and to stabilise her before a pair of tugboats arrived the next morning to tow her to Constanța. Regele Ferdinand was badly damaged by Soviet aircraft on 11 May after having loaded Axis troops at Sevastopol; their attacks damaged her fuel system to the extent that she ran out of fuel despite passing oil hand-to-hand in a bucket brigade and had to be towed a short distance to Constanța. Regina Maria made two trips to evacuate Axis troops and was part of the last convoy to reach Sevastopol on the night of 11/12 May. Regele Ferdinand was slightly damaged during a Soviet airstrike on Constanța on 20 August.

After the capitulation of Romania to the Soviet Union in August 1944, the sisters were seized and incorporated into the Black Sea Fleet as Likhoy (Лихой, ex-Regele Ferdinand) and Letuchiy (Летучий, ex-Regina Maria). They were commissioned into the Soviet Navy on 20 October 1944. The two ships were returned in 1951 and were renamed D21 and D22, respectively, in the Naval Forces of the Romanian People's Republic. They served until 1961 when they were discarded and subsequently scrapped.

Notes

Citations

Bibliography
 
 

 
 
 

 

 
World War II destroyers of Romania
World War II destroyers of the Soviet Union
Ships built in Italy
Italy–Romania relations